The mycotoxin phomoxanthone B, or PXB for short, is a toxic natural product. It is a less toxic isomer of phomoxanthone A and one of the two founding members of the class of phomoxanthone compounds. The phomoxanthones are named after the fungus Phomopsis, from which they were first isolated, and after their xanthonoid structure. Chemically, they are dimers of two tetrahydroxanthones that are covalently linked to each other. PXB itself is a homodimer of two identical diacetylated tetrahydroxanthones. The position of the link between the two tetrahydroxanthones is the only structural difference between PXB and its isomers PXA and dicerandrol C: In PXA, the two xanthonoid monomers are symmetrically linked at C-4,4’, while in PXB, they are asymmetrically linked at C-2,4’, and in dicerandrol C, they are symmetrically linked at C-2,2’.

References 

Mycotoxins
Natural products
Xanthonoids